Der kleine Doktor is a German television series.

See also
List of German television series

External links
 

German crime television series
1974 German television series debuts
1974 German television series endings
Television shows set in France
Television shows based on short fiction
German-language television shows
ZDF original programming
Television shows based on works by Georges Simenon